Pakundia may refer to:

 Pakundia Municipality, town and municipality in Kishoreganj, Dhaka Division, Bangladesh
 Pakundia Upazila, upazila in Kishoreganj, Dhaka Division, Bangladesh